Zehri is a tribal or clan name mainly found in Balochistan, Pakistan.

Notable people with the surname Zehri include the following politicians from Balochistan, Pakistan:
 Israr Ullah Zehri (born 1965)
 Mir Naimatullah Zehri, member-elect of the Provincial Assembly of Balochistan
 Mir Ziaullah Zehri (born 1981), current Provincial Minister of the Balochistan for Forest and Wildlife
 Sanaullah Khan Zehri (born 1961), Chief Minister of Balochistan from 24 December 2015 to 9 December 2017

References

Surnames
Baloch tribes
Social groups of Pakistan